Saujana Golf and Country Club is a two 18-holes golf course in Shah Alam, Petaling District, Selangor, Malaysia. 

The Japanese School of Kuala Lumpur is located on the grounds of the resort.

Saujana Resort residential development
There are several up-market residential developments in the Saujana Resort.
Gated Communities 
These neighbourhoods, with homes on private land, are located around the fringes of the golf course:
Lake View
Pinggiran Golf
Palm View 
Glenhill Saujana
Maplewoods Saujana

Condominiums
Bunga Raya Condominium
Serai Saujana
Amaya Saujana

Events
Malaysian Open golf tournament

References

External links

Official website

Golf clubs and courses in Malaysia
Shah Alam
Sports venues in Selangor
Populated places in Selangor